Biker’s Adda is an Indian Marathi language film directed by Rajesh Latkar. The film starring Santosh Juvekar and Prarthana Behere. Music by Vishy Neemo. The film was released on 9 October 2015.

Synopsis 
Four youngsters start a biking club in order to fuel their passion and enthusiasm for bike racing. Their lives, however, change when the club slowly transforms into a drug haven.

Cast 
 Santosh Juvekar as Vicky 
 Jai Aditya Giri as Krish
 Prarthana Behere
 Shrikant Moghe
 Hrishikesh Mandke
 Shrikant Wattamwar
 Rahulraj Dongare
 Nikhil Rajeshirke
 Devendra Bhagat
 Anirudh Hariip
 Tanvie Kishore

Soundtrack

Critical response 
Biker’s Adda film received mixed reviews from critics. A. reviewer from Zee News gave the film a rating of 2.5/5 and wrote "The screenplay of the movie is often messed up, how can it work by focusing only on the stunts... this should have been thought by the director". Mihir Bhanage of The Times of India gave the film 2 stars out of 5 and wrote "Biker’s Adda might be a genuine and dedicated experiment but a confused execution halts its progress. More action and much less drama would’ve done wonders for the film". Soumitra Pote of Maharashtra Times wrote "The only positive thing about this movie is that the stunts are really thrilling. But only stunts. The rest has nothing to do with anything".

References

External links
 

2015 films
2010s Marathi-language films
Indian drama films